The Calandro River, is a river of southern Italy, flowing into the Gulf of Taranto a little north of Roseto Capo Spulico, and about  south of the mouth of the Siris (modern Sinni).

It is mentioned as a river of Lucania by both Pliny and Strabo, the former of whom appears to place it to the north of Heraclea: but his authority is not very distinct, and Strabo, on the contrary, clearly states that it was in the territory of Thurii, on which account Alexander of Epirus sought to transfer to its banks the general assembly of the Italian Greeks that had been previously held at Heraclea. It was probably the boundary between the territories of Heraclea and Thurii.

A canal on Mars was named Acalandrus for this river.

References

Rivers of Italy
Rivers of the Province of Cosenza
Heraclea Lucania